Cathy Mitchell may refer to:

 Cathy Mitchell (television personality), infomercial host and author
 Cathy Mitchell (politician), American politician

See also
 Kathy Mitchell